The 2016 Southeastern Conference baseball tournament was held from May 24 through 29 at Hoover Metropolitan Stadium in Hoover, Alabama.  The annual tournament determined the tournament champion of the Division I Southeastern Conference in college baseball.  The tournament champion earns the conference's automatic bid to the 2016 NCAA Division I baseball tournament

The tournament has been held every year since 1977, with LSU claiming eleven championships, the most of any school.  Original members Georgia and Kentucky along with 1993 addition Arkansas have never won the tournament.  This is the nineteenth consecutive year and twenty-first overall that the event has been held at Hoover Metropolitan Stadium, known from 2007 through 2012 as Regions Park.

Format and seeding
The regular season division winners claimed the top two seeds and the next ten teams by conference winning percentage, regardless of division, claimed the remaining berths in the tournament.  The bottom eight teams play a single-elimination opening round, followed by a double-elimination format until the semifinals, when the format reverts to single elimination through the championship game. This is the fourth year of this format.

Bracket

Schedule

All-Tournament Team
The following players were named to the All-Tournament Team.

Bold is MVP.

References

Tournament
Southeastern Conference Baseball Tournament
Southeastern Conference baseball tournament
Southeastern Conference baseball tournament
College sports tournaments in Alabama
Baseball competitions in Hoover, Alabama